Cáceres Ciudad del Baloncesto, also named as Cáceres Patrimonio de la Humanidad for sponsorship reasons, is a professional basketball team based in Cáceres, Extremadura, Spain. It plays in the LEB Oro, the second in importance in Spain after ACB League.

The club should not be confused with Cáceres Club Baloncesto, the former elite team in the city, which was dissolved in 2005.

History
Cáceres Ciudad del Baloncesto was founded in 2007 as a merger of two teams from Cáceres city:
San Antonio
Ciudad de Cáceres

Cáceres played the first season in its history (2007–08) in LEB Plata after buying the berth to CEB Llíria. In this first year, playing as Cáceres 2016, the team achieved the promotion semifinals but, after beating CajaRioja in the quarterfinalist series, lost against CB Illescas in the semifinal played at Cáceres.

After this season, the team joined the second tier, the LEB Oro, after achieving the vacant of Palma Aqua Màgica. Cáceres continues playing in LEB Oro until nowadays, where reached two times in a row the promotion playoffs but failed in the quarterfinals: in 2010 versus Ford Burgos and in 2011 versus Blu:sens Monbús, both times by 3–1.

In 2012 the club won for the first time a LEB Oro quarterfinal serie, 3–2 to Ford Burgos, but failed in the semifinal against Club Melilla Baloncesto after five games. Same happened in 2013, when the club advanced to semifinals after defeating CB Breogán by 2–3 in the quarterfinals and failing 3–1 against River Andorra.

In 2013 the club opted by joining the LEB Plata again due to economic issues. On April 25, 2015, two years after its resign to play in LEB Oro, Cáceres came back to the league after winning the 2014–15 LEB Plata, by defeating CEBA Guadalajara 67–63 in the last game of the regular season.

The 2019–20 season is its fifth straight season in LEB Oro and tenth overall.

Sponsorship naming
Cáceres 2016: 2007–11
Cáceres Creativa: 2011
Cáceres Patrimonio de la Humanidad: 2011–

Head coaches

 Fede Pozuelo: 2007
 Piti Hurtado: 2007–2009
 Gustavo Aranzana: 2009–2012
 Carlos Frade: 2012–2013
 Ñete Bohígas: 2013–2019
 Roberto Blanco: 2019–present

Players

Current roster

Depth chart

Season by season

Notable players

 Devin Schmidt

 Lucio Angulo
 José Ángel Antelo
 José María Panadero
 Carlos Cherry
 Juan Sanguino
 Jeff Xavier
 Randy Holcomb
 Jelani McCoy
 Drew Naymick
 Wayne Simien
 Harper Williams
 Luis Parejo
 Mansour Kasse
 Sergio Pérez
 Georgios Dedas
 Ragnar Nathanaelsson
 Warren Ward
 Angelo Chol
 Javier Carter
 Ricardo Úriz

Trophies and awards

Trophies
LEB Plata: (1)
2015
Copa Extremadura: (2)
2008, 2011

See also 
Cáceres Club Baloncesto

References

External links
Official website

2007 establishments in Spain
Basketball teams established in 2007
Basketball teams in Extremadura
LEB Oro teams
Former LEB Plata teams
Sport in Cáceres, Spain